Anton Halén (born 28 November 1990) is a Swedish handball player for IFK Kristianstad and the Swedish national team.

References

External links

1990 births
Living people
Swedish male handball players
HK Drott players
Frisch Auf Göppingen players
IFK Kristianstad players